These are the official results of the Men's Hammer Throw event at the 1987 World Championships in Rome, Italy. There were a total of 26 participating athletes, with the final held on Tuesday September 1, 1987. The qualification round was staged on Monday August 31, 1987, with the mark set at 80.00 metres.

Medalists

Schedule
All times are Central European Time (UTC+1)

Abbreviations
All results shown are in metres

Records

Qualification

Group A

Group B

Final

See also
 1984 Men's Olympic Hammer Throw (Los Angeles)
 1986 Men's European Championships Hammer Throw (Stuttgart)
 1987 Hammer Throw Year Ranking
 1988 Men's Olympic Hammer Throw (Seoul)
 1990 Men's European Championships Hammer Throw (Split)

References
 Results
 hammerthrow.wz

H
Hammer throw at the World Athletics Championships